The 2022 Asian Men's Youth Handball Championship was the 9th edition of the Asian Men's Youth Handball Championship, a biannual championship in handball organized by the Asian Handball Federation (AHF).

The 9th edition of this tournament was originally scheduled to take place from 15 to 26 August 2020, but was postponed due to the COVID-19 pandemic, and then finally cancelled.

The venue is Khalifa Sports City Stadium, Isa Town.

The top five teams qualified for the 2023 Men's Youth World Handball Championship in Croatia.

Teams 

Following 11 teams intended to participate in the championship.

Draw 

The draw was held on Wednesday, 8 June 2022 at 19:30 at the Millennium Hotel and Convention Centre, Salmiya, Kuwait.

Preliminary round 
All times are local (UTC+3).

Group A

Group B

Final round

Bracket

5–8th place semifinals

Semifinals

Ninth place game

Seventh place game

Fifth place game

Third place game

Final

Final standings

References

External links

Asian Men's Youth
Asian Handball Championships
Asian Men's Youth Handball Championship
Asian Men's Youth Handball Championship
Asian Men's Youth Handball Championship
International handball competitions hosted by Bahrain
Asian Men's Youth Handball Championship